Khar Posht may refer to:
Khar Posht, Isfahan
Khar Posht, Kerman